Do U Know is the 3rd studio album by Hong Kong-based singer Janice Vidal, released on 21 November 2006. The album is named after Diana Ross's Theme from Mahogany (Do You Know Where You're Going To), which Vidal covers on the album. The album contains songs in both Cantonese and English.  The music videos on this album are extracts from the musical film A Melody Looking.

Track listing
Interlude (愛才 Piano version)
離家出走 "Run Away from Home"
愛你還愛你 "Love You, Still Love You"
霎眼嬌 "Charming Eyes"
越幫越忙 "Making Things Worse"
愛才 "Love Talent"
深愛 "Deep Love"
拍錯拖 "Wrong Partner"
"Do You Know Where You're Going To" (Diana Ross cover)
等 "Waiting"
這正是我 "This Is Who I Am"
離家出走 (Piano version)
The Christmas Tunes

DVD Music video listing
Trailer of 'A Melody Looking' DVD release
愛才 "Love Talent"
離家出走 "Run Away from Home"
越幫越忙 "Making Things Worse"
愛你還愛你 "Love You, Still Love You"

Awards
TVB Top 10 single – 離家出走 "Run Away from Home"

References

2006 albums
Janice Vidal albums